Gudu (also known as Gudo, Gutu) is an Afro-Asiatic language spoken in Nigeria in Adamawa State in the Song LGA.  Kumbi is a dialect.

Notes 

Biu-Mandara languages
Languages of Nigeria